The 1995 European Road Championships were held in Trutnov, the Czech Republic, in the last weekend of August 1995. These European Road Championships were the first regulated by the European Cycling Union. The event consisted of a road race for men and women under 23.

Schedule

Road race 

Saturday 26 August 1995
 Women U23

 
 Men U23

Events summary

Medal table

References

External links
The European Cycling Union

European Road Championships, 1995
Road cycling
European Road Championships by year
Cycling